Acadia Parish School Board is a school district headquartered in Crowley, Louisiana, United States. The district serves all of Acadia Parish.

Current Board members

District One – Dr. James W. Proctor
District Two – Douglas J. LaCombe
District Three – Delo Hebert, Jr.
District Four – Rebecca Foux Atkinson
District Five – Steve Jones
District Six – Ike Richard
District Seven – James Higginbotham
District Eight – Milton R. Simar

Notable board members
 John Travis Nixon (1867-1909), publisher of what became The Crowley Post Signal

School uniforms 
Beginning in the 1999–2000 school year the school district requires all students to wear school uniforms." Acadia Parish School Board.

Schools

Preschool 

 Central Rayne Kindergarten (Rayne)
 Crowley Kindergarten (Crowley)

Elementary schools 

Branch Elementary (Branch)
Church Point Elementary (Church Point)
Egan Elementary (Egan)
Estherwood Elementary (Estherwood)
Evangeline Elementary (Evangeline)
Iota Elementary (Iota)
Martin Petitjean Elementaryl (Rayne)
Mermentau Elementary (Mermentau)
Mire Elementary (Rayne)
Morse Elementary (Morse)
North Crowley Elementary (Crowley)
Richard Elementary (Church Point)
Ross Elementary (Crowley)
South Crowley Elementary (Crowley)
South Rayne Elementary (Rayne)

Middle schools 

 Armstrong Middle (Rayne)
 Church Point Middle (Church Point)
 Crowley Middle (Crowley)
 Iota Middle (Iota)

High schools 
Church Point High (Church Point)
Crowley High (Crowley)
Iota High (Iota)
Midland High (Midland)
Rayne High School (Rayne)

Alternative Education 

Acadia Parish Alternative (Crowley)

References

External links 
 Acadia Parish School Board

School districts in Louisiana
Education in Acadia Parish, Louisiana
School districts established in 1887
1887 establishments in Louisiana